Green Mesa is an ice-free mesa of  extent, located  west-southwest of Canfield Mesa in the western part of the Insel Range, Victoria Land, Antarctica. 

It was named by the Advisory Committee on Antarctic Names (1997) after William J. Green, of the School of Interdisciplinary Studies, Miami University, who from the 1968–69 season made studies of lakes and streams in Taylor Valley and Wright Valley, including a geochemical analysis of the Onyx River and Lake Vanda with Donald E. Canfield (after whom Canfield Mesa was named) in 1980–81, 1986–87, and 1987–88. Green was co-editor (with E. Imre Friedmann) of Physical and Biogeochemical Processes in Antarctic Lakes, Antarctic Research Series, Vol. 59, American Geophysical Union, 1993.

References

Mesas of Antarctica
Landforms of Victoria Land
McMurdo Dry Valleys